The Blood of Hussain is a 1980 Pakistani drama film directed by Jamil Dehlavi. The film was released in February 1981 in the UK. The film was banned throughout Pakistan as the military junta led by General Zia-ul-Haq toppled the government of Zulfiqar Ali Bhutto.

Premise
The film is about the life and death of Hussain, the youngest son of a Pakistani family. He meets a holy soothsayer who foretells his destiny, which is to liberate the poor and oppressed against a tyrannical government. Parallels exist between the film's plot and the historical Battle of Karbala between Imam Hussain and Yazid ibn Muawiya during the 7th century history of Islam.

Cast
Aliya Begum
Durriya 
Fauzia Zareen
Kabuli Baba
Khayyam Sarhadi
Imran Peerzada
Kika Markham
Jamil Dehlavi
Mirza Ghazanfar Beg
Mubila
Salmaan Peerzada
Samina Peerzada
Saqi 
Shoaib Hashmi
Zil-e-Subhan

Alternative titles
The Blood of Hussain is known as To Aima tou agonisti in Greece, Husseins Herzblut in Germany and Le Sang d'Hussain in France.

Banning
The film was banned by the Pakistani military ruler General Zia ul-Haq, after he seized power in a coup de état and became President of Pakistan in 1977, as the film portrays a fictional military coup in a less than favourable light. The ban on the film has not been lifted, and the director later moved to the United Kingdom. The film was eventually released and shown on British television.

Credits
Director: Jamil Dehlavi
Production Company: Parindah Films Limited
Producer: Jamil Dehlavi
Associate Producer: Sharira Masood, Sandra Marsh
Production Accountant: Gerry Wheatley
Production Manager: Kaiser Baig
Assistant Director: Imran Peerzada
Continuity: Omar Norman, Marian Nicholson
Screenplay: Jamil Dehlavi
Dialogue Writer: Raficq Abdulla
Director of Photography: Walter Lassally, Jamil Dehlavi
Assistant Camera: Ashiq Rahi
Focus Puller: Tony Garratt
Key Grip: Afzal Akhtar
Electrician: Barkat Joseph, Mohammed Saeed
Special Effects: Colin Arthur
Editor: Sue Collins, Jamil Dehlavi
cost: Rashida Masood
Make-up: Colin Arthur
Titles/Opticals: Les Latimer Film Associates
Music Supervisor: Jamil Dehlavi
Playback singer: Reshma
Sound: Christian Wangler, Shahid Rasool
Boom Operator: Javed Khan
Dubbing Mixer: Paul Carr
Sound Editor: Martin Evans
Studio: Mark One Films Studios, (London)

Release
Release date: 1980
Country: Pakistan
System: N/A
Format: 35mm Film
Length: 10068 Feet
Run time: 112.0 mins.
Colour/Black and White: Colour
Colour systems: N/A
Sound/Silent: Sound
Sound systems: N/A
Language: Urdu, English, Punjabi and Seraiki

TV transmission
First Transmission date: February 16, 1983
Country: Great Britain
Series/Slot: N/A
Start time: 22:00
Stop time: 00:00
Duration: 120 mins.
Company: N/A
Channel: Channel Four
Second transmission date: October 2, 1988
Country: Great Britain
Series/Slot: N/A
Start time: N/A
Stop time: N/A
Duration: N/A
Company: Channel Four
Channel: N/A

See also
Jamil Dehlavi

References

External links

Dehlavi Films - The Blood of Hussain

1980 films
1980 drama films
Pakistani drama films
English-language Pakistani films
1980s in Pakistan
1980s English-language films